The 1957 Buenos Aires Grand Prix was a Formula Libre race held at Buenos Aires on 27 January 1957, at the Autódromo Oscar Alfredo Gálvez. The race was held over two heats of 30 laps each, with the result declared as an aggregate of the two. Juan Manuel Fangio finished first and third, his aggregate time giving him a win only 25 seconds ahead of Jean Behra's two second places. The race was run in extremely hot conditions which led to several cases of driver exhaustion, with some retiring and handing over to a team mate.

Classification 

Buenos Aires Grand Prix
1957 in motorsport
1957 in Argentine motorsport